Alan Paris (born 15 August 1964) is an English former professional footballer who played as a right back, making over 250 career appearances.

Playing career
Born in Slough, Paris played for Slough Town, Watford, Peterborough United, Leicester City and Notts County.

Managerial career
In October 2017, Paris was appointed manager of Hellenic Premier Division side Burnham. He left the role in February 2018. In the summer of 2018 he was appointed manager of Langley having previously been working with the club's youth system.

References

1964 births
Living people
English footballers
Slough Town F.C. players
Watford F.C. players
Peterborough United F.C. players
Leicester City F.C. players
Notts County F.C. players
English Football League players
Association football defenders
English football managers